Thomas Batson was a rugby union international who represented England from 1872 to 1875.

Early life
Thomas Batson was born on 1846 in Ross.

Rugby union career
Batson made his international debut on 5 February 1872 at The Oval in the England vs Scotland match.
Of the three matches he played for his national side he was on the winning side on three occasions.
He played his final match for England on 15 February 1875 at The Oval in the England vs Ireland match.

References

1846 births
1933 deaths
English rugby union players
England international rugby union players
Rugby union forwards